Ugo Amoretti (6 February 1909 – 1977) was an Italian footballer and coach who played as a goalkeeper.

External links
 Career summary by playerhistory.com 

1909 births
1977 deaths
Footballers from Genoa
Italian footballers
Italy international footballers
Serie A players
U.C. Sampdoria players
Brescia Calcio players
Calcio Padova players
Genoa C.F.C. players
ACF Fiorentina players
Juventus F.C. players
Palermo F.C. players
Italian football managers
U.C. Sampdoria managers
A.S. Sambenedettese managers
F.S. Sestrese Calcio 1919 players
Association football goalkeepers
U.S. Imperia 1923 players
People from Sampierdarena